Cora udebeceana is a species of basidiolichen in the family Hygrophoraceae. Found in Colombia, it was formally described as a new species in 2016 by Bibiana Moncada, Rouchi Nadine Peláez-Pulido, and Robert Lücking. The specific epithet udebeceana is a semi-acronym of the District University Francisco José de Caldas in Bogota, UDBC (using the letters "u-de-be-ce"), whose herbarium holds the largest collection of lichens in Colombia. The lichen is only known to occur at the type locality in the Peña de Santa Bárbara Natural Reserve (Junín, Cundinamarca). Here it grows as an epiphyte on tree branches in mountainous rainforest.

References

udebeceana
Lichen species
Lichens described in 2016
Lichens of Colombia
Taxa named by Robert Lücking
Basidiolichens